"Chanter pour ceux qui sont loin de chez eux" (English: Sing for those who are far from home) is a 1985 song recorded by French singer-songwriter Michel Berger on his album Différences. It was released as a single one year later.

Lââm version
In 1998, the song was covered by French singer Lââm and was released in September 1998 as her debut single and the lead single from her album Persévérance. The song was in fact released two years before, in 1996, but passed unnoticed at the time. Lââm promoted the song singing it live in many French TV shows. In Tapis rouge, she cried a lot after her performance. The single became a number-one hit for five weeks in Belgium (Wallonia) and peaked at #2 for ten weeks in France, being unable to dislodge the hit "Belle" by Garou, Patrick Fiori and Daniel Lavoie. However, it managed to stay on the chart (top 100) for 42 weeks, becoming to date Lââm's most successful single.

Track listings
 CD single
 "Chanter pour ceux qui sont loin de chez eux" (radio edit) – 4:20
 "Chanter pour ceux qui sont loin de chez eux" (R&B mix) – 4:21
 "Laissez-moi aller au bout de mes rêves" – 4:33

Certifications

Charts

Other covers
Montserrat Caballé and Johnny Hallyday covered the song jointly in 1997 on the album Friends for Life, 

Lââm accompanied by 500 Choristes sung it in a live version in 2006 on the album 500 Choristes Vol. 2.

Other notable cover versions include Chico & The Gypsies in the full title of the song and by Florent Pagny, Kids United and The Song Family in a shortened title "Chanter pour ceux".

References

1986 singles
1985 songs
Lââm songs
Ultratop 50 Singles (Wallonia) number-one singles
Songs written by Michel Berger
1998 debut singles